Crocoite is a mineral consisting of lead chromate, PbCrO4, and crystallizing in the monoclinic crystal system. It is identical in composition with the artificial product chrome yellow used as a paint pigment.

Description 
Crocoite is commonly found as large, well-developed prismatic adamantine crystals, although in many cases are poorly terminated. Crystals are of a bright hyacinth-red color, translucent, and have an adamantine to vitreous lustre. On exposure to UV light some of the translucency and brilliancy is lost. The streak is orange-yellow; Mohs hardness is 2.5–3; and the specific gravity is 6.0.

It was discovered at the Berezovskoe Au Deposit (Berezovsk Mines) near Ekaterinburg in the Urals in 1766; and named crocoise by F. S. Beudant in 1832, from the Greek κρόκος (krokos), saffron, in allusion to its color, a name first altered to crocoisite and afterwards to crocoite.  In the type locality the crystals are found in gold-bearing quartz-veins traversing granite or gneiss and associated with crocoite are quartz, embreyite, phoenicochroite and vauquelinite. Phoenicochroite is a basic lead chromate, Pb2CrO5 with dark red crystals, and vauquelinite a lead and copper phosphate-chromate, Pb2CuCrO4PO4OH, with brown or green monoclinic crystals. Vauquelinite was named after Louis Nicolas Vauquelin, who in 1797 discovered (simultaneously with and independently of M. H. Klaproth) the element chromium in crocoite.

Abundant masses with exceptional examples of crocoite crystals have been found in the Extended Mine at Mount Dundas as well as the Adelaide, Red Lead, West Comet, Platt and a few other Mines at Dundas, Tasmania; they are usually found in long slender prisms, usually about 10–20 mm but rarely up to 100 mm (4 inches) in length, with a brilliant lustre and color. Crocoite is also the official Tasmanian mineral emblem. Other localities which have yielded good crystallized specimens are Congonhas do Campo near Ouro Preto in Brazil, Luzon in the Philippines, Mutare in Mashonaland, near Menzies in Western Australia, plus Brazil, Germany and South Africa.

The relative rarity of crocoite is connected with the specific conditions required for its formation: an oxidation zone of lead ore bed and presence of ultramafic rocks serving as the source of chromium (in chromite). Oxidation of Cr3+ into CrO42− (from chromite) and decomposition of galena (or other primary lead minerals) are required for crocoite formation. These conditions are relatively unusual.

As crocoite is composed of lead(II) chromate, it is toxic, containing both lead and hexavalent chromium.

Crocoite from Tasmania has been mined from the Dundas Extended Mine by Mike and Eleanor Phelan since the mid-1980s, but the mine's origins date back to 1892 when it was used as a prospecting tunnel for silver lead. As at April 2019, the mine is for sale (A$300,000) with the owners then continuing to operate the nearby Stichtite mine.

Gallery 
Examples of crocoite

See also 
 Bellite

References 

 
 Bushmakin, A.F., 1996. Crocoite from the Berezovsk gold mines. World of Stones, 10, 28-31
 Bottrill, R.S., Williams, P., Dohnt, S., Sorrell, S. and Kemp, N.R. (2006). Crocoite and associated minerals from Dundas and other locations in Tasmania. Australian Journal of Mineralogy. 12, 59-90

External links 

 List of Tasmanian state emblems

Lead minerals
Chromate minerals
Monoclinic minerals
Minerals in space group 14
Luminescent minerals